Peter Andreas Grendelmeier (born 27 April 1967 in Männedorf, Switzerland) is a Swiss curler.

Teams

References

External links
 
 PETER ANDREAS GRENDELMEIER

Living people
1967 births
People from Meilen District
Swiss male curlers
Swiss curling champions
Sportspeople from the canton of Zürich